Moses Kiyai (born 1962) is a retired Kenyan long jumper and triple jumper.

Kiyai won the bronze medal at the 1982 African Championships. He won the East African Championships in the long jump 1981, 1982 and 1984 and became triple jump champion in 1982. At the 1982 Commonwealth Games he finished sixth in the long jump and eighth in the triple jump. He also competed at the 1984 Olympic Games without reaching the final in neither long nor triple jump.

His personal best jump was 8.08 metres, achieved in May 1984 in Lincoln, Nebraska. In the triple jump he had 16.27 metres from 1986.

References 

1962 births
Living people
Kenyan male long jumpers
Kenyan male triple jumpers
Athletes (track and field) at the 1984 Summer Olympics
Olympic athletes of Kenya
Athletes (track and field) at the 1982 Commonwealth Games
Commonwealth Games competitors for Kenya